Cape Wallace is the cape marking the northern extremity of Limets Peninsula and the north-west end of Low Island in the South Shetland Islands of Antarctica. Though the origin of the name Cape Wallace is unknown, it has appeared on charts for over a hundred years and its usage has been established internationally.

Important Bird Area
Cape Wallace has been identified as an Important Bird Area (IBA) by BirdLife International because it supports a very large breeding colony of about 150,000 pairs of chinstrap penguins.  About 250 pairs of gentoo penguins also nest there.

References

Wallace, Cape
Important Bird Areas of Antarctica
Penguin colonies